Glencoe, Nova Scotia may refer to the following places:
Glencoe, Guysborough County, Nova Scotia
Glencoe, Inverness County, Nova Scotia
Glencoe, Pictou County, Nova Scotia

See also
Glencoe (disambiguation)